Max Cutler (born December 31, 1990) is an American entrepreneur, creator, investor, producer and businessman best known for founding the podcast Studio Parcast in 2016.

With Cutler at the helm, Parcast has launched some of the most popular and highly-ranked weekly, podcasts, specializing in popular genres like mystery, true crime, pop culture, wellness and history. After three years of exponential growth, Spotify acquired Parcast in 2019. Cutler maintains his role as head of the studio, revolutionizing the podcast space and delivering hit after hit. Most recently featured on Fortune 40 Under 40, Forbes 30 Under 30 and The Hollywood Reporter's 35 Rising Executives Under 35 lists, Cutler shows no sign of slowing down, taking on additional responsibility as Spotify’s Head of New Content Initiatives. Parcast continues to lead the Podcast industry in global growth with over 140 adaptations, in eight different languages, and will continue its expansion into new markets in the future.

Early life 

Cutler was born and raised in Los Angeles, California. He attended Viewpoint School, a nondenominational school in Calabasas, California. He earned a bachelor's degree in finance and entrepreneurship from the University of Arizona in 2013.

Cutler's father, Ron Cutler, is a veteran radio broadcaster, who went by the name Ron Diamond. Ron started Cutler Productions, a radio syndication company in the 1980s. Max has cited his father as having a huge influence on his career and life.

Career 

In June 2016, Max Cutler founded the podcasting Studio Parcast without outside investment. While, he has cited podcast Serial by Sarah Koenig as an inspiration his vision has been to produce high quality content on a weekly basis as opposed to seasonally. Four years later, Parcast's scope has expanded into a variety of additional genres, including: True Crime, pop culture, mystery, science fiction, and history genres as well as fictional audiodramas like Mind's Eye (2018). In second half of 2021, Parcast started producing limited run investigation series, including successful podcasts Imposters and Revelations (A partnership with Blumhouse Productions) Parcast reaches over 750 million downloads a year, has a team of over 120 staff and produces 140+ shows a week worldwide in eight different languages. Cutler sees a great opportunity to continue Parcast’s expansion in the UK with a new partnership with Noiser, which has led to hit podcast Deathbed Confessions.

Cutler is responsible for creating and producing some of the most well-known podcasts like Serial Killers, Conspiracy Theories, Dare to Lead, Supernatural, Horoscope Today and International Infamy to name a few.

On April 1, 2019 Spotify acquired Parcast for an estimated ~$115 million. Cutler is currently the Managing Director of Parcast at as well as Head of New Content Initiatives at Spotify.

Under Cutler's leadership, Parcast continues to grow by working with some of the most established creators in the world; greenlighting and producing a variety of new shows with nontraditional podcast talent such as Kim Kardashian, Brené Brown, Addison Rae, plus many more. Cutler also helps produce some of the most established podcasters in the world like Ashley Flowers, Ash and Alaina from Crime Countdown and most recently Alex Cooper from Call Her Daddy.

In June 2021, Cutler helped secure a deal with Call Her Daddy to come exclusively to Spotify.

In January 2021, it was announced that Cutler will be tasked with additional responsibilities as Spotify's Head of New Content Initiatives. In this role Cutler will oversee all new content creation and partnerships for spoken word audio, including Greenroom, Kids Content and Audiobook Originals. Even though Greenroom is still in beta, the team has been able to secure impressive slate of shows and exciting talent to the platform.

Cutler was included in Forbes 30 under 30 Class of 2019, Hollywood Reporters Next Generation Executive List for 2020 and Fortune 40 Under 40 List for 2020.

More recently Cutler has become an active investor in the startup community. Investing in numerous digital entertainment startups including Moment House and Fanhouse.

References 

Living people
American radio personalities
American podcasters
University of Arizona alumni
Spotify people
1990 births